Joseph Arthur Sealy (born 16 August 1939) is a Canadian jazz musician. He was awarded the Order of Canada in 2010.

Awards
 Juno Awards of 1982 - Nominee for Best Jazz Album - Clear Vision
 Juno Awards of 1995 - Nominee for Best Contemporary Jazz Album - Joe Sealy & Paul Novotny Dual Vision
 Juno Awards of 1997 - Winner for Best Contemporary Jazz Album - Africville Suite
 Juno Awards of 2000 - Nominee for Best Contemporary Jazz Album - Instrumental - Joe Sealy & Paul Novotny Blue Jade

References

External links 
 Entry in The Canadian Encyclopedia
 

Canadian jazz pianists
Canadian jazz composers
Male jazz composers
Black Canadian musicians
Members of the Order of Canada
Living people
1939 births
Juno Award for Contemporary Jazz Album of the Year winners
Jazz radio presenters
Canadian radio personalities
Place of birth missing (living people)
Canadian male pianists
21st-century Canadian pianists
21st-century Canadian male musicians
Sackville Records artists